1st seeds Scott Lipsky and David Martin won in the final 5–7, 6–1, [10–8], against Sanchai and Sonchat Ratiwatana.

Seeds

Draw

Draw

References
 Doubles Draw

Singapore ATP Challenger - Doubles
2011 Doubles
2011 in Singaporean sport